The 1953 Florida Gators football team represented the University of Florida during the 1953 college football season. The season was the fourth for Bob Woodruff as the head coach of the Florida Gators football team. The 1953 season was a year of rebuilding and backsliding after the graduation of All-American Charlie LaPradd and the loss of fullback Rick Casares to the U.S. Army. The highlight of the season was the Gators' second consecutive victory over the Georgia Bulldogs, but the Gators began a pattern of agonizingly close losses to the Rice Owls (16–20), Auburn Tigers (7–16), Tennessee Volunteers (7–9) and Miami Hurricanes (10–14), as well as two ties with the Georgia Tech Yellow Jackets (0–0) and LSU Tigers (21–21). Woodruff's 1953 Florida Gators finished with a 3–5–2 overall record and a 1–3–2 record in the Southeastern Conference (SEC), placing ninth of twelve SEC teams.

Schedule

References

Florida
Florida Gators football seasons
Florida Gators football